Kirkia is a genus of plant in family Kirkiaceae. It was previously placed in family Simaroubaceae, but was transferred into Kirkiaceae, together with Pleiokirkia, because these genera produce neither quassinoids nor limonoids.

The genus name of Kirkia is in honour of Sir John Kirk,  (1832–1922), who was a physician, naturalist, companion to explorer David Livingstone, and British administrator in Zanzibar.

Species
It contains the following species (6), but this list may be incomplete):
 Kirkia acuminata Oliv., 1868, South Africa (Transvaal), Namibia, Botswana, SW-Angola, SE-D.R. Congo (Zaire), Malawi, Zambia, Zimbabwe, Mozambique 
 Kirkia burgeri B. Stannard  Ethiopia; Somalia
 Kirkia dewinteri Merxm. & Heine, 1960  Namibia 
 Kirkia leandrii (Capuron) Stannard, 2007  Madagascar; syn.: Pleiokirkia leandrii Capuron, 1961 
 Kirkia tenuifolia  Engl., 1902   SE-Ethiopia, Somalia, Djibouti, Kenya 
 Kirkia wilmsii Engl., South Africa (Transvaal)

Journal
'Kirkia' is also the name of 'The Zimbabwe Journal of Botany', published by the National Herbarium and Botanic Garden, Zimbabwe. Since 1960 to the present day and written in English.

References

Sapindales genera
Sapindales
Taxonomy articles created by Polbot
Taxa named by Daniel Oliver